Link control may refer to:

Data link layer, also known as data link control (DLC)
High-Level Data Link Control (HDLC)
Synchronous Data Link Control (SDLC)